Delphine Bernard (born 14 May 1986 in Quimper, Brittany, France) is a wheelchair fencer, practising in fencing three categories, foil, épée and sabre.

She started fencing in 2007, after meeting Serge Laher, who became her master of arms at Quimper club Cornouaille, in Finistère until 2013, when she left to Toulouse University Club (TUC), where she is directed by Brigitte Aragou.

Sports 
Delphine Bernard finished her scientific Baccalaureate, Earth and life Sciences mention, at Kerneuzec high school, Quimperlé, in 2005. In 2009, she finishes her common studies so as to get her degree as a sports educator at Quimper.

In 2006, by chance, Delphine Bernard meets master Serge Laher, in an associations forum where she participated searching to practice sports in her own town. Mr. Laher teaches her fencing handisport, paralympic domain open to physically disabled people since 1960. She started practicing in 2007. Under Mr. Laher direction, she participates at the World Cup, then in 2012, she gets the fifth place at the foil tournament 2012 Summer Paralympics in London. She goes afterward to the 2013 Budapest World Cup.

In November 2013, she moves to Toulouse University Club (TUC), where she exercises with Brigitte Aragou direction. She had trained nine hours a week under Serge Laher direction at Quimper club. Now she trains four times a week at TUC, with disabled and non-disabled athletes. She also has personal training articulated with group training with her new master of arms, Brigitte Arago.

In 2014, she participates of the European Cup at Strasbourg, when she gets again a fifth place.

In February 2016, she is chosen, with her teammate Maxime Valet, fencing for the disabled at the 2016 Rio summer paralympic games.

Extra-sports Life 

Delphine Bernard is a member of HOPE association, which aims to promote motor disabled people through competitions, as well as to help athletes who participate in paralympic games.

Style 

Wheelchair fencing became a passion for her. She loves competitions and winning. Fencing needs one to be precise, alert, able to adapt quickly, but also to have a great observation capacity, quickness.

Delphine aims to develop sports in such a way as to integrate disabled people and promote a true "cultural revolution", according to her, in the world of sports.

Training

Prize list

Paralympics games 

 Fencing for the disabled at 2012 London Summer paralympic games : 5th at foil

World Cup 
 Bronze medal at 2015 Doha World Cup

Europe Cup 
 5th at Strasbourg 2014 European Cup
 * 2009 and 2011, Europe foil team, vice-champion

World Cup 
 Her first World Cup participation, in 2007, Manchester
 3rd épée, 2007
 3rd épée, Montréal, 2008
 2nd épée, Montréal, 2010
 1st foil, Montréal, 2010

France Cup 
 2010 France champion, foil, épée and sabre
 2011 France champion, épée
 2011 France Vice champion, foil and sabre and foil team
 1 gold and 1 bronze 2014 France Cup

References

External links 
 
 

1986 births
Living people
Sportspeople from Quimper
French female épée fencers
Wheelchair fencers at the 2012 Summer Paralympics
Wheelchair fencers at the 2016 Summer Paralympics
Paralympic wheelchair fencers of France
French female foil fencers
French female sabre fencers